Homer Bowen Butler III (born January 26, 1957) is a former American football safety in the Canadian Football League for the Saskatchewan Roughriders. He played college football at UCLA.

Early years
Butler attended Los Angeles High School, where he practiced football and track. He was a starter at wide receiver and was named All-city as a senior. 

He enrolled at Los Angeles City College. As a freshman, he averaged 18 yards on 31 receptions. As a sophomore, he averaged almost 20 yards on 40 receptions. He had 4 touchdowns against San Bernardino Valley College, breaking Kermit Alexander's school record. He scored 13 touchdowns in 2 seasons and was a two-time All-conference selection. He also was an All-conference shortstop in baseball.

He transferred to UCLA for his junior season. As a starting wide receiver, he was second on the team with 11 receptions fot 166 yards (15.1-yard avg.) and 2 touchdowns. As a senior, he led the team with 25 receptions for 584 yards (23.4-yard avg.) and 4 touchdowns.

Professional career

Dallas Cowboys
Butler was selected by the Dallas Cowboys in the eighth round (222nd overall) of the 1978 NFL Draft, to convert him into a defensive back. He was waived on August 13.

Saskatchewan Roughriders (CFL)
In August 1978, he was signed as a free agent by the Saskatchewan Roughriders of the Canadian Football League. He played safety and was a kickoff returner.

References

External links
Homer Butler Stats

1957 births
Living people
Players of American football from Los Angeles
American football safeties
Los Angeles City Cubs football players
UCLA Bruins football players
Saskatchewan Roughriders players
Los Angeles High School alumni
Players of Canadian football from Los Angeles